Generals' chess may refer to:

Shogi (将棋) or Japanese chess
Janggi (장기/將棋) or Korean chess
Xiangqi or Chinese chess, known in Vietnam as cờ tướng (棋將)